Olyutorsky District is an administrative and municipal district (raion) of Koryak Okrug of Kamchatka Krai, Russia, one of the eleven in the krai. It is located in the northeast of the krai. Its administrative center is the rural locality (a selo) of Tilichiki. Population:  The population of Tilichiki accounts for 34.6% of the district's total population.

Geography
The major rivers in the district are the Pakhacha and Apuka, having their headwaters close to the north-flowing Mayn River, as well as the Ukelayat and the Velikaya River flowing into the Bering Sea. Lantzeff speaks also of the Olyutora River, which does not appear on modern maps and which he distinguishes from the Pakhacha. The Olyutor Range, Pikas Range and Ukelayat Range mountain chains, as well as the southern part of the Komeutyuyam Range are in the district.

History
In 1714, Russians built the ostrog (fortress) of Olyutorsk to control the coast and land route from Kamchatka to Anadyrsk; a function it shared with Aklansk. It was besieged by the Yukaghirs and Koryaks. It lost its importance after the sea route from Okhotsk was opened.

Demographics
The Alyutors, a branch of the Koryaks lived in the area or somewhat west. There were also Yukaghirs, some of whom had been brought south by the Russians.

 Russians – 43.8%
 Chukchi – 23.1%
 Koryaks – 21.5%
 Evens – 5.9%
 Ukrainians – 2.5%
 Tatars – 0.6%
 Others – 2.6%

References

Notes

Sources

External links

Districts of Kamchatka Krai